Eudonia quaestoria is a moth in the family Crambidae. It was described by Edward Meyrick in 1929. This species is endemic to New Zealand.

The wingspan is 22–25 mm. The forewings are brown, with a slight ferruginous tinge. The first and second lines are whitish. The hindwings are whitish-grey, but greyer posteriorly. Adults have been recorded on wing in November.

References

Moths described in 1929
Eudonia
Moths of New Zealand
Endemic fauna of New Zealand
Taxa named by Edward Meyrick
Endemic moths of New Zealand